Panzer Corps: Wehrmacht is a computer wargame developed by Lordz Games Studio and Flashback Games, and published by Slitherine Software for Windows on July 11, 2011. A sequel, Panzer Corps 2, was released in March 2020.

Gameplay
Panzer Corps is a turn-based strategic wargame played on a hex grid. It covers World War II from the German perspective.

Release
Before Panzer Corps, lead designer Alex Shargin made a Panzer General fan remake, Panzer General Forever. Panzer Corps was announced on December 2, 2010. It was described as similar to Panzer General series. An iPad version was scheluded for third quarter of 2012 but it was delayed to December 2013. Panzer Corps Gold was released on October 6, 2016. It includes the main game and 17 expansion packs. A macOS port was released on May 4, 2017.

Reception

Panzer Corps received "generally favorable" reviews according to review aggregator Metacritic. Many compared the game to the Panzer General series.

Daniel Shannon of GameSpot summarized: "Panzer Corps is a great turn-based strategic wargame that captures Panzer General's deep and involving classic gameplay."

Tim Stone of PC Gamer said that the only negative aspect of the game was the steep price since there was "free fan-made versions of Panzer General 2 available".

Bodo Naser of 4Players gave a score 84 out of 100 to the Afrika Korps expansion and said it's "[a] very solid and very entertaining standalone add-on with a new theatre and well proven tactical challenges.

Luke Plunkett of Kotaku called the game "one of the best strategy games you can get on the PC" in 2014.

See also
Warhammer 40,000: Armageddon, Slitherine's 2014 game that uses the engine from Panzer Corps

References

External links
 (archived)
Panzer Corps at The Lordz Games Studio (archived)
Panzer Corps at Flashback Games

2011 video games
Computer wargames
IOS games
MacOS games
Multiplayer and single-player video games
Multiplayer hotseat games
Play-by-email video games
Slitherine Software games
Top-down video games
Turn-based strategy video games
Video games about Nazi Germany
Video games with downloadable content
Video games with expansion packs
Windows games
World War II video games
Flashback Games games